Luxmichari is an upazila of Khagrachari District in the Division of Chittagong, Bangladesh.

Geography
It has total area 220.15 km2.

Demographics

According to the 2011 Bangladesh census, Lakshmichhari Upazila had 6,084 households and a population of 25,994, 8.0% of whom lived in urban areas. 11.5% of the population was under the age of 5. The literacy rate (age 7 and over) was 35.2%, compared to the national average of 51.8%.

Administration
Lakshmichari Upazila is divided into three union parishads: Barmachhari, Dulyatali, and Lakshmichhari. The union parishads are subdivided into 16 mauzas and 134 villages.

See also
Upazilas of Bangladesh
Districts of Bangladesh
Divisions of Bangladesh

References

Upazilas of Khagrachhari District